William Hugh Ferrar (1826–1871), a Latinist, was a classical Irish scholar at Dublin University.

In 1868, Ferrar discovered that four medieval manuscripts. Namely minuscules 13, 69, 124, and 346, were closely related texts. They are descendants of an archetype from Calabria in southern Italy or Sicily. Now they are known as Ferrar Group or Family 13.

Works 

 W. H. Ferrar, A Comparative Grammar of Sanskrit, Greek and Latin (London, 1869)
 W. H. Ferrar, A Collation of Four Important Manuscripts of the Gospels, ed. T. K. Abbott (Dublin: Macmillan & Co., 1877) - edited posthumoustly.

See also 

 Ferrar Group

References 

1826 births
1871 deaths
Academics of Trinity College Dublin